Puccinia xanthii is a plant pathogen infecting sunflowers. It also causes rust on Xanthium occidentale and can be used as a form of biological control where this plant is an invasive species.

See also
 List of Puccinia species

References

Fungal plant pathogens and diseases
Sunflower diseases
Fungal pest control agents
xanthii
Fungi described in 1822